Skräcknatten i Fasenbo is a 1985 children's book by Gunnel Linde.

Plot summary
Lunsan tells Petter and Anders she is afraid of the dark. When Petter and Anders boast that they are not, she challenges them and gives them a mission: to sleep overnight inside a deserted and supposedly haunted house outside the village where they live. 

Neither of them knows that the other is also there, and they both spend a disturbed night hearing strange noises. It is not until the next day that they learn they have in fact frightened each other.

References

1985 children's books
Ghosts in written fiction
Swedish children's literature